Events in 2016 in Japanese television.

Ongoing

Ending

New Series & Returning Shows

Sports Events

Special Events

Deaths

See also
 2016 in anime
 2016 in Japan
 2016 in Japanese music
 List of Japanese films of 2016

References